The 1939–40 İstanbul Football League season was the 32nd season of the league. Beşiktaş JK won the league for the 4th time.

Season

References

Istanbul Football League seasons
Turkey
2